The Criminal Investigator II (Traditional Chinese: O記實錄II; lit. The O Files II) is a 1996 Hong Kong police procedural television drama. Produced by Jonathan Chik with a screenplay edited by Chow Yuk-ming and Chiu Ching-yung, the drama is a TVB production and the direct sequel to 1995's The Criminal Investigator. The story follows a team of investigators from the Organized Crime and Triad Bureau (OCTB) unit of the Royal Hong Kong Police Force.

Characters

OCTB unit

Team A

CIB unit

Other characters
Gigi Lai as Tammy Fong Siu-fong (方小芳)
Bondy Chiu as Bonnie Wong Ming-wai (王明慧)
Mariane Chan as Louisa Chan Sin-mei (陳善美)
Choi Kwok-hing as Lam Sam (林森)
Benz Hui as Fong Sai-yin (方世賢)
Lau Siu-ming as Wong Hong-kwai (王康貴)
Pak Yan as Lai Kit-yu (黎潔如)
Gregory Rivers as Gary

References

TVB dramas
1996 Hong Kong television series debuts
1996 Hong Kong television series endings
Hong Kong action television series
Hong Kong crime television series
Hong Kong police procedural television series
Serial drama television series
Sequel television series
1990s Hong Kong television series